Love Is a Mix Tape: Life and Loss, One Song at a Time is an autobiographical memoir by Rob Sheffield. It follows his first meeting of Renée Crist, their love for each other, and the eventual loss when Renée suddenly passes away from a pulmonary embolism in 1997 after only 5 years of being married. Music is explored throughout the book; how music brought him and his wife together, their shared love of music and how music helped him cope with losing her. Each chapter is prefaced with a mixtape or list of tracks that correspond to the plot.

An audiobook version of the book read by Sheffield was released.

Reception 
The book received reviews from publications including Publishers Weekly, Kirkus Reviews, The A.V. Club, Creative Loafing, Newsweek, The Austin Chronicle, The Denver Post, and Los Angeles Times.

References

External links 
 NPR interview with Rob Sheffield about the book 

2007 non-fiction books
American autobiographies
Music autobiographies
Crown Publishing Group books